Verkhny Begenyash (Ürge Bägänäş) is a rural locality (a village) in Semyonkinsky Selsoviet, Aurgazinsky District, Bashkortostan, Russia. The population was 95 as of 2010. There is 1 street.

Geography 
Verkhny Begenyash is located 32 km southwest of Tolbazy (the district's administrative centre) by road. Talnik is the nearest rural locality.

References 

Rural localities in Aurgazinsky District